Bursuceni is a commune in Sîngerei District, Moldova. It is composed of two villages, Bursuceni and Slobozia-Măgura.

Notable people
 Leonida Lari

References

Communes of Sîngerei District